Aldemir Gomes da Silva Junior (born 8 June 1992) is a Brazilian sprinter.

Da Silva won three gold medals at the 2011 South American Junior Championships in Athletics in Medellín, Colombia.

He won three gold medals at the 2012 South American Under-23 Championships in Athletics in São Paulo, Brazil.

He qualified to represent Brazil at the 2020 Summer Olympics.

Personal bests
100 m: 10.13 s (wind: +1.6 m/s) –  Bragança Paulista, 29 August 2019
200 m: 20.15 s (wind: +1.3 m/s) –  São Bernardo do Campo, 11 June 2017
200 m: 20.13 s (wind: +2.3 m/s) –  Segovia, 14 July 2019

International competitions

1Did not start in the final
2Disqualified in the semifinals

References

External links

1992 births
Living people
Brazilian male sprinters
Athletes (track and field) at the 2012 Summer Olympics
Athletes (track and field) at the 2016 Summer Olympics
Olympic athletes of Brazil
Athletes (track and field) at the 2015 Pan American Games
World Athletics Championships athletes for Brazil
Pan American Games silver medalists for Brazil
Pan American Games medalists in athletics (track and field)
Athletes (track and field) at the 2018 South American Games
South American Games gold medalists for Brazil
South American Games medalists in athletics
Competitors at the 2017 Summer Universiade
Medalists at the 2015 Pan American Games
Ibero-American Championships in Athletics winners
Troféu Brasil de Atletismo winners
Athletes (track and field) at the 2020 Summer Olympics
Athletes from Rio de Janeiro (city)
21st-century Brazilian people